Whalom Park was an amusement park located on Lake Whalom in Lunenburg, Massachusetts, that operated from 1893 to 2000. The site was redeveloped into a 240-unit condominium complex.

Whalom Park was established in 1893 by the Fitchburg & Leominster Street Railway as a traditional, English-style park of gardens and walking paths. At the time of its last day of operations in 2000, Whalom was known as the 13th oldest amusement park in the United States, as well as the second-oldest trolley park in the world. The park had been in continuous seasonal operation for 107 years.

The "Flying Comet" wooden roller coaster was one of the park's best-known rides. Most remaining structures at the park, including the Flyer Comet, were demolished in October 2006, to make way for development.

Rides and attractions

Gallery

Appearances in pop culture
The music video for the song "Touch and Go" by The Cars was shot at Whalom Park in 1982

TV advertisement jingle 
There were two versions of the jingle:

First Version

If you're looking for something exciting to do,
Then Whalom Park is the place for you!
With lots of rides and loads of fun,
Whalom Park's for ev-ery-one!
For fun and excitement,
A place to unwind, happpynesss

Whalom Paaaark...for a whale of a time!
Whalom Park, you'll have a good time

Second Version

If you need excitement, then come for the fun!
Whalom Park, it's for everyone!
Amusement rides! And water slides!
Whalom Park, it's family sized!
Picnics and good times! Rides, games, and shows!
Whalom's got it! C'mon let's gooooooo!
Great for the family! It's one of a kind!
Whalom Paaaark...for a whale of a time!

See also
List of amusement parks in New England
List of defunct amusement parks
Amusement ride

References

External links

 The New Whalom Park Ownership Program, LLC
  Interactive Map of Whalom Park (1980s)
 Bob Cornellier's Whalom Park site
 Laff in the Dark article about Whalom Park

Amusement parks in Massachusetts
1893 establishments in Massachusetts
2000 disestablishments in Massachusetts
Defunct amusement parks in the United States
Buildings and structures in Worcester County, Massachusetts
Lunenburg, Massachusetts